is a 1957 black-and-white Japanese film directed by Ryo Hagiwara.

Cast 
 Hibari Misora
 Kōji Tsuruta
 Akio Kobori (小堀明男)
 Machiko Kitagawa (北川町子)
 Shunji Sakai (堺駿二)
 Kyu Sazanka (山茶花究)
 Nakajiro Tomita (富田仲次郎)
 Joji Kaieda (海江田譲二)
 Ryuzaburo Mitsuoka (光岡龍三郎)
 Kinnosuke Takamatsu (高松錦之助)

References

1957 films
Japanese black-and-white films
1950s Japanese films